In mathematical analysis, a C0-semigroup Γ(t), t ≥ 0, is called a quasicontraction semigroup if there is a constant ω such that ||Γ(t)|| ≤ exp(ωt) for all t ≥ 0. Γ(t) is called a contraction semigroup if ||Γ(t)|| ≤ 1 for all t ≥ 0.

See also
 Contraction (operator theory)
 Hille-Yosida theorem
 Lumer-Phillips theorem

References

  

Functional analysis
Semigroup theory